Maybank is a surname. Notable people with the surname include:

Aletha Maybank (born 1974), American physician
Anthuan Maybank (born 1969), American sprinter
Burnet R. Maybank (1899–1954), American politician
Hannah Maybank (born 1974), British artist
Ralph Maybank (1890–1965), Canadian politician
Teddy Maybank (born 1956), British footballer